The William Black Family House is a historic house at 311 West Ash Street in Brinkley, Arkansas.  Built in 1895, this two-story wood-frame house is one of the finest examples of Queen Anne architecture in eastern Arkansas.  It has asymmetrical massing, and numerous projections, towers, and porches characteristic of the style.  Its siding includes different shaped shingles and clapboarding, and decorative vergeboard in some of its gables.  The front porch has turned posts and balustrade, and a delicate spindlework arch in one of its bays.  It was built for the widow of William Black, a prominent local businessman, politician, and veteran of the American Civil War.

The house was listed on the National Register of Historic Places in 1976.

See also
National Register of Historic Places listings in Monroe County, Arkansas

References

Houses on the National Register of Historic Places in Arkansas
Queen Anne architecture in Arkansas
Houses completed in 1895
Houses in Monroe County, Arkansas
National Register of Historic Places in Monroe County, Arkansas